The 2006 Formula Renault 2.0 UK Championship was the 18th British Formula Renault Championship season. The season began at Brands Hatch on April 9 and finished at Silverstone on October 15, after twenty rounds. The championship was won by Sebastian Hohenthal with Fabio Onidi winning the Graduate Cup.

Teams and drivers
{|
|

Calendar
All races held in United Kingdom.

Championship Standings
The season include 20 rounds. The final standing was established with the best 18 results of the season. A Graduate Cup (G) classification is also established for young drivers. The team standings include all two best results in each round without additional points for Fastest lap.
Point system : 32, 28, 25, 22, 20, 18, 16, 14, 12, 11, 10, 9, 8, 7, 6, 5, 4, 3, 2, 1. In each race 2 points for Fastest lap.

 (1) = Include only the 18 best results.
 (G) = Graduate Cup runners, include only the 10 best results.

References

External links
 The official website of the Formula Renault UK Championship

UK
Formula Renault UK season
Renault 2.0 UK